is a Japanese actor and voice actor from Hyōgo Prefecture. He is represented by Himawari Theatre Group. He was the official Japanese voice dub-over artist for actor: Rupert Grint as Ron Weasley in the Harry Potter film series and for Daryl Sabara.

Filmography

TV Drama
Hoshi ni Negai wo (NHK: 1998)
Shin Ude ni Oboeari (NHK: 1998)
Suki to Isshin Tasuke (NHK: 1999, 2000)
Ichigen no Koto (NHK: 2000)
Kowai Nichiyōbi (NTV: 2000)
Oyaji. (TBS: 2000)
Hikon Kazoku (Fuji-TV: 2001)
Nemurenu Yoru wo Daite (TV Asahi: 2002)

Anime
Cyborg 009: The Cyborg Soldier (Pal)

OVA
Return to Neverland (Cubby)
Back to the Conscience (Pinocchio)

Video games
Kingdom Hearts (Pinocchio, Flounder)

Dubbing

Live-action
A.I. Artificial Intelligence (David (Haley Joel Osment))
Butterfly (Moncho)
Cherrybomb (Malachy)
The Cider House Rules (Homer Wells)
The Cat in the Hat (Conrad)
Don't Look Under the Bed (Darwin McCausland)
Driving Lessons (Ben Marshall)
Harry Potter Series as Ron Weasley (Rupert Grint)
Harry Potter and the Philosopher's Stone
Harry Potter and the Chamber of Secrets
Harry Potter and the Prisoner of Azkaban
Harry Potter and the Goblet of Fire
Harry Potter and the Order of the Phoenix
Harry Potter and the Half Blood Prince
Harry Potter and the Deathly Hallows – Part 1
Harry Potter and the Deathly Hallows – Part 2
Home Alone 4 (Kevin McCallister)
The Kid (Rusty Duritz)
Life Is Beautiful (Joshua)
The Mummy Returns (Alex)
Pearl Harbor (Danny as a child)
The Santa Clause 2 (Curtis)
Spy Kids (Juni Cortez (Daryl Sabara))
Spy Kids 2: Island of Lost Dreams (Juni Cortez (Daryl Sabara))
Spy Kids 3-D: Game Over (Juni Cortez (Daryl Sabara))
Spy Kids 4-D (Juni Cortez)
Thunderpants (Alan A. Allen)
Wild Target (Tony)

Animation
Dragon Tales (Enrique)
Return to Never Land (Cubby)

Japanese Voice-Over
Dragon Tales (Enrique)
Pinocchio's Daring Journey (Pinocchio)
Peter Pan's Flight (Cubby)

CM
Touyou Suisan

References

External links
 

1991 births
Living people
Japanese male child actors
Japanese male video game actors
Japanese male voice actors
Male voice actors from Hyōgo Prefecture